Daniel Ernest Henning,  (born June 21, 1942) is a former American football player and coach.  A quarterback, he played college football at the College of William & Mary and professional football in 1966 for the San Diego Chargers of the American Football League (AFL).  Henning served as a head coach in the  National Football League (NFL) for the Atlanta Falcons (1983–1986) and the Chargers (1989–1991).  He was the head football coach at Boston College from 1994 to 1996.  Henning then returned to the NFL as an offensive coordinator for the Buffalo Bills in 1997. After Hall of Fame coach Marv Levy retired, reportedly partially due to his reluctance to fire Henning, Henning left Buffalo.

Coaching career
While the head coach of Boston College, Henning discovered a major sports betting scandal among his own players, the second major gambling scandal to affect Boston College athletics in less than 20 years.  It had been an open secret that football players were gambling, even though NCAA rules bar any form of gambling by student-athletes.  However, after a 45-17 thumping at the hands of Syracuse on October 26, 1996, Henning heard rumors that players were betting against their own team.  At a team meeting later that week, Henning asked anyone who was involved in gambling to stand up.  No one did so.  After the Eagles lost a close game to Pittsburgh a week later—one in which they were 11-point favorites—an irate Henning demanded that anyone involved in gambling come forward.  At a players-only meeting two days later, anywhere from 25 to 30 players admitted gambling, but the five that the captains suspected of betting against their own team failed to own up.  Henning notified university officials of his suspicions, and they were concerned enough to call in Middlesex County district attorney Thomas Reilly, who launched an investigation.

The resulting inquiry resulted in the suspension of 13 players for the final three games of the season, and eight of them never played another down for the Eagles again. With the effects of the scandal and a 16–19–1 record after three seasons, Henning retired at the end of the 1996 season.

Henning had two stints as the offensive coordinator with the Washington Redskins (1981–82, 1987–88). He won two Super Bowl rings during this time.

He was the offensive coordinator for the Carolina Panthers from 2002 until January 2007. Henning helped lead his team to the Super Bowl after the 2003 season. After the 2005 season in which the Panthers returned to the NFC Championship game, they were considered Super Bowl contenders in 2006. However, the offense struggled due to injuries and what critics deemed conservative play-calling by Henning, resulting in an 8–8 season and his firing.

In 2008, Henning was named offensive coordinator for the Miami Dolphins, throwing wrinkles in the offense which put Ronnie Brown as quarterback leading to a 38–13 win at the New England Patriots. His implementation of the "Wildcat" and single-wing offense, which he had previously used in Carolina with DeAngelo Williams, was covered heavily by the media, and soon adopted by several other NFL teams in 2008 and 2009.

Personal life
His son, Dan, played college football as a quarterback at Maryland under head coach Bobby Ross. His brother, John Henning was a long time Boston news reporter.

Head coaching record

College

NFL

See also
 List of American Football League players

References

1942 births
Living people
American Football League players
American football quarterbacks
Atlanta Falcons head coaches
Boston College Eagles football coaches
Buffalo Bills coaches
Carolina Panthers coaches
Detroit Lions coaches
Florida State Seminoles football coaches
Houston Oilers coaches
Miami Dolphins coaches
National Football League offensive coordinators
New York Jets coaches
San Diego Chargers players
San Diego Chargers head coaches 
Sportspeople from the Bronx
Players of American football from New York City
St. Francis Preparatory School alumni
Virginia Tech Hokies football coaches
Washington Redskins coaches
William & Mary Tribe football players